The Humble Man and the Chanteuse (German: Der Demütige und die Tänzerin) is a 1925 German silent film directed by E. A. Dupont and starring Lil Dagover, Olga Limburg and Margarete Kupfer. It was based on a novel by Felix Hollaender.

The film's art direction was by Oscar Friedrich Werndorff.

Cast
Lil Dagover as Toni Seidewitz
Olga Limburg as Trude Wessely
Margarete Kupfer as Frau von Bülow
Hans Mierendorff as manufacturer Liesegang
Georg Baselt
Paul Bildt as Liesegang's servant
Gertrud de Lalsky as Professor Müller-Osten 
Karl Elzer   
Robert Garrison   
Harry Halm as Prinz 
Martin Kettner as theater agent 
Arnold Korff as intendant 
Eberhard Leithoff as The Humble / Bandleader
Adolf E. Licho
Harald Paulsen
Louis Ralph as Raimondi, doctor
Hans Sternberg as variety director Pullmann

References

External links

Films of the Weimar Republic
German silent feature films
Films directed by E. A. Dupont
Terra Film films
German black-and-white films